Spyro Reignited Trilogy is a platform video game developed by Toys for Bob and published by Activision. It is a collection of remasters of the first three games in the Spyro series: Spyro the Dragon (1998), Ripto's Rage! (1999), and Year of the Dragon (2000). It was released for the PlayStation 4 and Xbox One in November 2018 and for Nintendo Switch and Windows in September 2019.

Gameplay 

Spyro Reignited Trilogy is a remaster of the original Spyro trilogy developed by Insomniac Games for the PlayStation: Spyro the Dragon, Spyro 2: Ripto's Rage!, and Spyro: Year of the Dragon. Each game is a 3D platformer featuring the titular protagonist, a juvenile purple dragon named Spyro, as he attempts to restore peace in a set of worlds specific to each game by vanquishing enemies. Spyro's sidekick, a dragonfly named Sparx, acts as an indicator of his health, defending him from a limited number of enemy attacks. Additionally, the games feature a number of collectibles which must be acquired to make progress, such as gems, which also act as currency, and dragon eggs.

Spyro Reignited Trilogy attempts to mostly remain faithful to the gameplay of the original games. Each level is designed to match the size and layout of the levels in the originals. A few features included only in one or two of the original trilogy were unified across all three games in Reignited, such as the addition of "skill points" in the first game, or Spyro's ability to roll from side-to-side in later installments.

The remaster also made a few changes to content in the originals that was no longer considered appropriate. Some enemies in the first game, for example, wielded semi-automatic weapons in the original PlayStation version of the game; they wield paintball guns in the Reignited version. Additionally, a genie character in Ripto's Rage! had its name changed from "Bombo" to "Bob the Flagkeeper" to avoid referencing a stereotype of Arabs and Muslims common since before the publication of the original game.

However, most of the game's differences from the originals center around quality-of-life improvements. All the character's dialogues were re-recorded in their entirety with Tom Kenny providing Spyro's voice in all three games of Reignited. Visual graphics were overhauled, and non-playable characters were given more distinct and varied personalities. The soundtrack was also re-recorded, with the options to play "dynamic" versions of the new recordings, where tempo is adjusted with Spyro's movement, or switch back to the original recordings.

Development 

Discussions around the revival of Spyro the Dragon began as early as 2014. In July 2014, now former Sony Computer Entertainment chairman Andrew House stated that his team was considering bringing Spyro back, adding that he believed longtime fans would be interested in revisiting a character from their youth. Later that same year, Insomniac Games CEO Ted Price also stated that making a new Spyro game was a possibility. In 2017, developer Vicarious Visions stated that they were aware of how high the popular demand was for a revival of the classic Spyro trilogy following the release of their previous remaster, Crash Bandicoot N. Sane Trilogy.

The realization of Spyro remasters was originally teased in April 2018 when several media outlets received a package with a purple egg from someone under the alias "Falcon McBob". The Reignited Trilogy was officially revealed a few days later on April 5, 2018. After initially being scheduled for release on September 21, 2018, it was delayed and released on November 13 of the same year. The physical release of Reignited Trilogy contains the full game of Spyro the Dragon, as well as a subset of levels from Ripto's Rage! and Year of the Dragon. The remaining data must be downloaded as part of an in-game update. At E3 2019, versions for Nintendo Switch and Windows were announced and were released on September 3, 2019.

Unlike the N. Sane Trilogy, development of Reignited Trilogy was a more collaborative effort between Toys for Bob and Insomniac Games. In the early planning stages, the staff from Toys for Bob brought their concept sketches of the titular character to the original team and held several discussions on how the character should look, with especially strong input from Ted Price. One of the key goals of the Reignited Trilogy, according to art director Josh Nadelberg, was to "get Spyro right". This involved putting Spyro's model through rigorous stress tests to explore the range of emotions and expressions that could be yielded before and after the discussions with Insomniac staff. Because Insomniac Games could not provide source code or original assets to use as a reference, Toys for Bob utilized an in-house emulation tool called "Spyro-scope" which showed the schematics of a level's geometry and revealed patterns in enemy pathfinding.

Tom Kenny, who voiced Spyro the Dragon in the original Ripto's Rage and Year of the Dragon, reprised his role in Spyro Reignited Trilogy after 16 years with re-recorded voice lines, including the first game in which Spyro was originally voiced by Carlos Alazraqui. Stewart Copeland, the music composer of the original trilogy, wrote a new main theme for the compilation, though did not write any other new tracks for the project. The rest of Copeland's score for the trilogy was re-recorded by Stephan Vankov, an employee of Toys for Bob, with the game including an option to freely choose between the two soundtracks. Controls were updated for modern platforms in several key ways, such as shooting fire set to the back right button and camera control set to the right analog stick, with an option to revert to the original control scheme at any point from the pause menu. Reignited Trilogy uses the Unreal Engine 4 game engine. The game also received development assistance from Sanzaru Games, whose previous works include The Sly Collection and Sly Cooper: Thieves in Time, in developing the alternate gameplay styles in Year of the Dragon.

Reception

Spyro Reignited Trilogy received "generally favorable reviews" according to review aggregator Metacritic. Multiple aspects of the game were praised, such as the upgraded visuals, attention to detail, and faithfulness to the original trilogy. Jonathon Dornbush of IGN praised the game's attention to detail, noting both the level design, with "gorgeous horizons" and layouts "pristine and accurate to the original", and character upgrades, such as non-playable characters exhibiting more unique and expressive personalities. Mitch Wallace of Forbes similarly highlighted the game's detail, calling the levels "childlike fantasy made playable", while also praising Toys for Bob's ability to faithfully recreate the games despite not having access to the original source code. Chris Moyse of Destructoid commended the game's soundtrack for its rerecording, "dynamic" aspect in which tempo adjusted to match Spyro's activity, and the option to switch to the original recordings.

The game was criticized for issues such as long loading times, glitches, and frame-rate. Wallace noted all of these aspects, calling the loading times in particular "a tad unacceptable" for being "slightly longer" than those of the original games, despite being produced two decades later for more advanced consoles. Moyse noted that the game, in remaining faithful, retained some of the original games' flaws, particularly the overall "bland" and linear objectives. Jeremy Winslow of Slant reiterated that criticism, calling Ripto's Rage and Year of the Dragon "mere reskins" of the first game, while also chiding the game's inconsistent frame-rate and "slippery" controls.

While publisher Activision has not released sales figures, it stated Spyro Reignited Trilogy "performed well" in its initial release. In the UK, the game reached first place on the all-formats sales chart in its first week; while it sold less than Pokémon: Let's Go, it outsold both its Pikachu and Eevee versions individually. It placed at the sixth position in the Switzerland all-format charts. It was also the best-selling PlayStation 4 game in its first week in Australia.

Spyro Reignited Trilogy won the award for "Family/Kids Title of the Year" at the Australian Games Awards, and was nominated for the Freedom Tower Award for Best Remake at the New York Game Awards, and for "People's Choice" at the Italian Video Game Awards.

Notes

References

External links 
 
 
 

2018 video games
3D platform games
Activision video game compilations
PlayStation 4 games
Single-player video games
Spyro the Dragon video games
Video game remasters
Xbox One games
Unreal Engine games
Activision games
Nintendo Switch games
Trilogies
Windows games
Video games scored by Stewart Copeland
Dinosaurs in video games
Toys for Bob games
Video games developed in the United States
Iron Galaxy games